Insane (stylized as 1NSANE) is an off-road racing game by Invictus and distributed by Codemasters. While in development, it had been provisionally titled Off The Road. It is the spiritual successor to the tech-demo Terep 2 by lead programmer Nagymáthé Dénes.

A sequel, Insane 2, was released on 24 January 2012.

Gameplay 

Levels are set in real world locations, scattered throughout North America, Europe, Africa, Asia and Australia. The actual design, however, is fictitious. The single-player campaign comprises a series of championships in different vehicle classes, where the player unlocks new vehicles and locations, based on their score. Vehicles range from utility vehicles to light buggies and are either fictional or inspired by actual production vehicles. Though the names do not correspond with any actual vehicle, the fact is evident both visually in-game and in the names of the game's files.

Players can drive cars of their choices in either of nine events, which include Capture the Flag, Jamboree, Gate Hunt, Destruction Zone, Pathfinder, Off-Road Racing, Return the Flag, and Free Roam, which, exclusively, is available in practice mode.

Reception 

Insane received "average" reviews according to the review aggregation website Metacritic. Samuel Bass of NextGen said, "A fun, flawed game, 1nsane doesn't quite live up to the expectations raised by its ambitious design." Computer Games Strategy Plus gave it a favorable review, a few weeks before its U.S. release date.

Awards

References

External links 
 

2000 video games
Codemasters games
Off-road racing video games
Video games developed in Hungary
Windows games
Windows-only games
Multiplayer and single-player video games